A Little Game is a 2014 American family adventure film starring F. Murray Abraham, Ralph Macchio, Janeane Garofalo and Olympia Dukakis.

Plot
The story is about a 10-year-old girl named Max, living in Manhattan, NYC, whose interaction with a retired, fellow New Yorker teaches her about life and chess simultaneously.

At the beginning, Max goes to a local public school, but her parents feel that she isn't being challenged enough. They get her into a private school in the upper West Side, far from her home in lower Manhattan with a scholarship, but it means that her mother Sarah has to work many more hours. And Max has to take the subway every day.

On the way home after having to join the chess team without knowing how to play, while taking a detour through Washington Square Park, Max sees several people playing chess. The following day she asks Norman, who she had seen alone with a chess board, if he could teach her how to play. He initially discourages her, but her determination wins out.

Over a series of many days, Norman sends her on seemingly meaningless ‘tasks’, like not taking shortcuts to learn about chess. But rather, piece by piece, he describes how they move comparing them to people in the city. He explains Max  needs to think creatively and use her imagination. A pawn, like a small cautious child, needs friends by their side to support them. If they slip by unnoticed, they can eventually become a queen and win the game. A chess player has to adjust and change their plans with every move, just like in life.

So, the castle or rook moves only in straight lines, like how people can move in a church, along the aisle or down the rows. The knight like in small ovals… once she has learned how each piece works, he then starts her practising how to move them in a certain number of moves each time. First 5 moves, then first 20… She challenges her school rival, which angers Norman because he doesn't think she's ready. Max wisely says that it's time for her to make her own decisions.

A final lesson, Norman compares the timing in a chess match to life, that change is inevitable. ‘Enjoy it while it's here’. As she plays against her rival, she watches the other people in the park to remind her and help her with each move. Finally, she's in a position where she's told she can win in 3 moves, but chooses to forfeit the game and essentially return to her old life and school.

She learns that sometimes ‘an old pizza place closes so that a new one can open’.

Cast
F. Murray Abraham as Norman Wallach
Ralph Macchio as Tom Kuftinec
Janeane Garofalo as Sarah Kuftinec
Makenna Ballard as Max Kuftinec
Fatima Ptacek as Isabella
Oona Laurence as Becky
Olympia Dukakis as YaYa
Tovah Feldshuh as Blackstone Head of School
Rachel Dratch as Aunt Diane
Kimberly Quinn as Laura
Frank Pando as Officer

Reception
The film has a 40% rating on Rotten Tomatoes.  Renee Schonfeld of Common Sense Media gave the film three stars out of five.

References

External links
 
 
 

2014 films
American adventure films
Films about chess
2010s English-language films
2010s American films